The Reform Club is a London gentlemen's club.

Reform Club may also be:
Reform Club of Hong Kong, Hong Kong political group
Reform Club (Japan), 1920s Japanese political party
Manchester Reform Club, former club